This article lists notable mountains in the U.S. state of North Carolina.

Highest mountains
The following sortable table lists the 20 highest mountain peaks of North Carolina with at least  of topographic prominence. Listings found elsewhere may not necessarily agree because they do not include each of these mountains.

Other mountains

 Adams Mountain
 Albert Mountain
 Andrews Bald
 Bear's Paw
 Beaucatcher Mountain
 Bee Mountain
 Beech Mountain
 Big Butt Mountain
 Big Yellow Mountain
 Black Mountains
 Bluerock Mountain
 Bob Stratton Bald
 Brier Knob
 Brown Mountain
 Brushy Mountains
 Chestnut Mountain (Caldwell County, North Carolina)
 Chestnut Mountain (Transylvania County, North Carolina)
 Crowders Mountain
 Cold Mountain
 Crowder's Mountain
 Devil's Courthouse
 Eaglenest Mountain
 Flattop Mountain
 Grandfather Mountain
 Grandmother Mountain
 Great Craggy Mountains
 Great Smoky Mountains
 Gregory Bald
 Hanging Rock
 Hanging Rock State Park
 Hibriten Mountain
 Humpback Mountain
 King's Pinnacle
 Little Yellow Mountain
 Looking Glass Rock
 Max Patch
 Morrow Mountain
 Moore's Knob
 Mount Hardison
 Mount Jefferson
 Mount Pisgah
 North Eaglenest Mountain
 Occoneechee Mountain
 Old Butt Knob
 Peak Mountain
 Pilot Mountain
 Pixie Mountain
 Rich Mountain
 Rich Mountain Bald
 Saura Mountains
 Scaly Mountain
 Shining Rock
 Shuckstack
 Silers Bald
 Snake Mountain
 Standing Indian Mountain
 Stone Mountain
 Sugar Mountain
 Tanasee Bald
 Three Top Mountain
 Thunderhead Mountain
 Tricorner Knob
 Unicoi Mountains
 Uwharrie Mountains
 Whiteside Mountain
 Wayah Bald
 Woody's Knob

See also
List of mountains of the Appalachians
List of mountains in the United States
Geography of North Carolina
Southern Sixers

Notes

References

North Carolina
North Carolina
Mountains